Peter Kahara Munga is a businessman and entrepreneur in Kenya, the largest economy in the East African Community. He is the immediate past group chair of the Equity Bank Group, the largest bank holding company on the African continent, by customer numbers, with over 9.2 million customers as of 31 June 2014. He is reported to be one of the wealthiest individuals in Kenya, with a personal net worth exceeding US$100 million as of February 2014.

Background and education
Munga was born in Kangema in Kenya's Central Province in 1943.  
He went to Gaichanjiru high school. He received an honorary Doctor of Philosophy degree from University of Nairobi.

Career
In 1984, Munga founded Equity Building Society (EBS) in his hometown of Kangema, in Kenya's central highlands. With about KSh5,000 (about US$100 at that time) as starting capital, he convinced the Kenya government to issue him a license.

In 1993, Munga, as chairman, working in collaboration with the chief executive officer of EBS, hired James Mwangi, age 31, to wind up the insolvent organization. EBS was losing KSh5 million (approximately US$60,000 then) annually and had accumulated total losses of KSh33 million (approximately US$380,000 then). Mwangi, as director of finance at EBS, began to institute changes, resulting in the slow, but steady turn-around of the society. Also in 1993, Munga resigned as an assistant secretary in Kenya's Ministry of Water.

On 31 August 2004, EBS became Equity Bank Group and two years later was listed on the Nairobi Stock Exchange (NSE). On 18 June 2009, the bank's stock cross-listed on the Uganda Securities Exchange and started trading that day, under the symbol EBL. , the bank group has subsidiaries in Kenya, Uganda, Tanzania, Rwanda, and South Sudan.

Investment portfolio
Munga owned shares of stock in the publicly traded companies listed below, as of November 2014.

See also
List of African millionaires
List of wealthiest people in Kenya

References

External links
 Webpage of Equity Bank Group
 Webpage of British-American Investments Company
 Equity Bank Founder Follows Money In Industrial Ventures

Living people
1943 births
Kenyan businesspeople
Kikuyu people
Kenyan bankers